Velothon Berlin (officially Garmin Velothon Berlin, formerly ProRace Berlin) was a single-day road bicycle race held annually in May, between 2011 and 2015, in Berlin, Germany. It was part of the UCI Europe Tour as a 1.1 race. It was part of the UCI Velothon Majors series of races organised by Lagardère Unlimited, which also included Velothon Wales, Velothon Stockholm and Velothon Vienna. These events were characterised by mass-participation sportives before an elite race along a lengthened route.

Winners

References

External links
 

 Race at CQRanking

UCI Europe Tour races
Cycle races in Germany
Recurring sporting events established in 2011
2011 establishments in Germany
Sports competitions in Berlin
Recurring sporting events disestablished in 2015
2015 disestablishments in Germany
Defunct cycling races in Germany